Alberich Mazak, also Alberik Mazák (1609 – 9 May 1661) was a 17th-century Czech-Austrian composer.

Early life
Mazak was born in Ratibor to a Czech family. After studying music and philosophy, he entered Heiligenkreuz Abbey in 1631 and was ordained a priest in 1633.

Works, editions and recordings
Mazak created more than 300 compositions. He wrote masses, litanies, offertories, antiphons, psalms and sacred cantatas. The instruments he used most were the violin, the trumpet, the bassoon, the viola da gamba, the cornet and the sackbut. His compositions, predominantly motets, collected under the title Cultus harmonicus, were published by him in Vienna, Opus I in 1649, Opus Minus (II) in 1650 and Opus Maius (III) in 1653.  The last one is missing today.

Baroque Vespers at Stift Heiligenkreuz - Cistercian Monks of Stift Heiligenkreuz, Wieninger Oehms Classics C826 
De Profundis  re Bassi  Carpe Diem CD-16274

A baroque lute built in 1631, which had been played at Mazak's ordination, was used in the recording of Wolf Erichson's Stift Heiligenkreuz Geistliche Musik (Sacred Music from Holy Cross Monastery), directed by Niederaltaicher Scholaren and Dr. Konrad Ruhland and published by Sony Music under the SEON label (1970–1980).

References

1609 births
1661 deaths
17th-century classical composers
Austrian classical composers
Austrian Baroque composers
Czech classical composers
Czech male classical composers
Austrian male classical composers
People from Racibórz
Sackbut players
17th-century male musicians